Beaumont is a city and municipality of Wallonia located in the Belgian province of Hainaut, on the border with France. 

On 1 January 2012 Beaumont had a total population of 7,060. The total area is 92.97 km².

The municipality consists of the following districts: Barbençon, Beaumont, Leugnies, Leval-Chaudeville, Renlies, Solre-Saint-Géry, Strée, and Thirimont.

The Tour Salamandre, an 11th-century donjon, is the most remarkable remains of the ancient fortifications of Beaumont. It can still be visited and holds expositions of the town's history. 
The old castle, in which Napoleon spent a night before going to Waterloo in 1815, has been separated in two parts; one houses the town hall and the other contains a catholic secondary school, Paridaens.

Gallery

References

External links
 

Cities in Wallonia
Municipalities of Hainaut (province)